Zhaleh Alamtaj Ghaemmaghami (Persian: ژاله عالم تاج قائم مقامی [ transliteration further complicates and confuses matters: the (US) Library of Congress apparently goes for: ʻĀlamtāj Qāʼimʹmaqāmī (and Zhālah), while alternative Westernized spellings include Alamtaj Ghaemmaghami]) was born in 1883 in Farahan, Arak, Iran. She is one of the first female poets who showed her feminist attitudes in her poetry. The book Mirror of Dew was the first translation of her poems into English. She died in 1947 in Iran.

Life 

Zhaleh was born in 1883 in Farahan. She was the daughter of Gohar Malek and Mirza Fathollah. Mirza Fathollah was the great grandchild of Ghaemmagham Farhahi, the Iranian Prime Minister, briefly from 1834 to 1835. When Zhaleh was 5, she started learning reading Persian and Arabic, and studied other fields till 15. When she was 15, she moved to Tehran with her family in 1938. Her family forced her to marry her father's friend, Alimoradkhan Bakhtiari. Alimorad was working in the military. He was 40 years old. He had daughters from her ex-wife. When Zhaleh married him, the daughters were older than her. After their coercive marriage, Zhaleh gave birth to Hossein Pezhman Bakhtiari. After two or three years, Zhaleh got divorced. At first, Hossein lived with his father until he became 27. Then he lived with his mother till the end of his life.

Asghar Seyed-Gohrab says, "Zhale was married off, at fifteen, to a man she loathed. The cultured and well-educated young woman was completely mismatched with the much older military man, who already had other wives. The death of her parents during the first year of her marriage, and the birth of a son, presumably compounded the trauma. She did then soon divorce the man."

After her divorce, Zhaleh continued living in Farahan. Her departure from her child had impacts on her emotions.  Her feelings, depression, and gloomy life are all seen in her poems. Her personal hidden feelings are reflected in one of her poems about her son. So, subjectivity and womanhood were first founded in Zhaleh's poems.

She finally died at the age of 63, at 1 P.M, 27 September, 1947. She was buried in Imamzadeh Hassan, in the west of Tehran. 
Zhaleh was one of the critical and idealistic female poets. When she was 23, the Persian Constitutional Revolution took place.  During that period of time, the society held conservative views towards women, as well as their social activities. This made her portray her protesting voice against the submissive role of women in her poetry. This way, she helped women of her time get rid of the limitations. Her poetry was concerned about patriarchal society which suppressed women and deprived them of their rights.

Works 

She was the first female poet who dared to talk about her personal problems. Her poetry was not published for many years. She wrote them for herself. Even she buried a noticeable number of her poems. After so many years, finally her son collected her poems and got them published. Asghar Seyed- Gohrab writes that she denied that she was a poet even though a few of her works were published in 1993. He suggests, "She might be called the Emily Dickinson of Persian poetry".1

Her poetry is mostly autobiographical, a reflection of the tragedies and hardships that she went through in her personal life. She aimed to describe her protest against those stereotypes, beliefs, and expectations with regards to defending women rights. In her poetry, she portrays women's struggles with inequality between the genders in terms of positions and rights.

Zhaleh was an introspected poet; even though she lived in melancholy and gloomy situations, she wrote her poems while breaking the stereotypes and traditions about women. She hid her poetic skills during her life even from her son, Pezhman. As Pezhman puts, she lately spent her life reading books about Literature, History, and Astronaut.

According to the researches in national magazines, there were a few or no researches about her works and poetry. Even the feminist scholars and researchers did not pay enough attention to her. However, among all the articles and researches, Maryam Khalili Jahantigh and Mahsa Ghadir wrote an article comparing Zhaleh and Emily Dickinson's life and poetry. Based on the article, there are similarities between the two poets in part of their life and experiences, as well as poetry.

List of some of her works 

 Reproach to my Husband
 Message to the Unborn
 What Would Have Happened?

What Would Have Happened? 

Below you can find a part of one of her poems translated into English and Persian.

What Would Have Happened

O mother, what would have happened if I had not gotten a husband?

What would have happened if I had not gotten caught in misfortune?

If a story-teller had told a tale about my ill fortune,

I swear by that ill fortune, I would have not believed it.
 
Was I such a heavy burden? Would my handful of bones 

Have bent my father’s back if I hadn’t gotten a husband? 

What would you say I was at the banquet spread of our family’s life?

A little cat who would have asked for nothing other than a morsel to eat.

Zhâleh Qâ’em’maqâmi’s “Cheh Mishod” [What Would Have Happened] (pp. 54–5 in Mirror of Dew)

چه میشد 

چه می شد آخر ای مادر اگر شوهر نمی کردم 

گرفتار بلا خود را چه می شد گر نمی کردم 

گر از بدبختی ام افسانه خواندی داستان گویی 

به بدبختی قسم کان قصّه را باور نمی کردم 

مگر باری گران بودیم و مشت استخوان ما 

پدر را پشت خم می کرد اگر شوهر نمی کردم 

بران گسترده خوان گویی چه بودم گربه ای کوچک 

که غیر از لقمه ای نان خواهش دیگر نمی کردم

References

Sources
 
 
 Gould, Rebecca Ruth, "An Iranian Tsvetaeva," The Kenyon Review

1883 births
1947 deaths
20th-century Iranian poets
Iranian women poets
People from Arak, Iran
19th-century Iranian poets